Lac la Croix Research Natural Area is a natural area that is protected by the United States Department of Agriculture, specifically through the branch of the Forest Service. It is located in St. Louis County, Minnesota and is part of the Superior National Forest.

Ecology
Lac la Croix is a forested area that consists mostly of red and white pine trees.  It is one of the few remaining unmodified sections of "virgin pine" in the United States.  Moose, black bear, and white-tailed deer are common in the area.

Conservation 

The area was established as a Research Natural Area by the U. S. Forest Service in 1942. In February 1980 the United States Secretary of the Interior designated Lac la Croix Research Natural Area as a National Natural Landmark under the Historic Sites Act. This designation recognized the area as an outstanding example of the United States' natural history. The National Park Service describes the area as "old-growth virgin pine forests . . . [which] contains most of the physiographic and ecological features characteristic of the Boundary Waters region."

References

Wilderness areas of Minnesota
National Natural Landmarks in Minnesota
Forests of Minnesota
Protected areas of St. Louis County, Minnesota
Superior National Forest
1942 establishments in Minnesota
Protected areas established in 1942